The following is a list of state highways in the U.S. state of Louisiana designated in the 100–149 range.


Louisiana Highway 100

Louisiana Highway 100 (LA 100) runs  in an east–west direction from LA 97 in Evangeline to LA 13 in Crowley, Acadia Parish.

Louisiana Highway 101

Louisiana Highway 101 (LA 101) runs  in a general north–south direction from LA 14 in Hayes, Calcasieu Parish to LA 383 north of Iowa in Jefferson Davis Parish.

Louisiana Highway 102

Louisiana Highway 102 (LA 102) runs  in a northwest to southeast direction from US 165 in Fenton to LA 26 north of Lake Arthur, Jefferson Davis Parish.

Louisiana Highway 103

Louisiana Highway 103 (LA 103) runs  in a wide semi-circle around the north side of Opelousas, extending from US 190 west of Lawtell to LA 31 in Leonville, St. Landry Parish.

Louisiana Highway 104

Louisiana Highway 104 (LA 104) runs  in an east–west direction from LA 26 southeast of Oberlin, Allen Parish to US 190 in Opelousas, St. Landry Parish.

Louisiana Highway 105

Louisiana Highway 105 (LA 105) runs  in a north–south direction from a local road south of Krotz Springs, St. Landry Parish to a junction with LA 1 in Simmesport, Avoyelles Parish.

The route heads north along the west bank levee of the Atchafalaya River into Krotz Springs, where it crosses the Union Pacific Railroad (UP) line at Main Street. LA 105 then passes underneath the twin spans of the US 190 Atchafalaya River bridge between Baton Rouge and Opelousas. Continuing north from Melville, LA 105 passes through Bayou Current and intersects LA 360. It then crosses from St. Landry Parish into Avoyelles Parish and continues  further to its terminus at LA 1 at the foot of the Atchafalaya River bridge in Simmesport.

Louisiana Highway 106

Louisiana Highway 106 (LA 106) runs  in an east–west direction from LA 10 east of Oakdale in Evangeline Parish to LA 29 south of Bunkie, Avoyelles Parish.

Louisiana Highway 107

Louisiana Highway 107 (LA 107) runs  in a north–south direction from US 71 in Morrow, St. Landry Parish to the concurrent US 167/LA 28 in Pineville, Rapides Parish.

Louisiana Highway 108

Louisiana Highway 108 (LA 108) runs  in a general east–west direction from I-10 in Vinton to US 90 in Sulphur, Calcasieu Parish.

Louisiana Highway 109

Louisiana Highway 109 (LA 109) runs  in a north–south direction from the junction of US 90 and LA 3112 southwest of Vinton, Calcasieu Parish to LA 27 at Juanita, Beauregard Parish.

Louisiana Highway 110

Louisiana Highway 110 (LA 110) runs  in a northwest to southeast direction from US 190 in Merryville to the concurrent US 171/US 190 in Longville, Beauregard Parish.

LA 110 initially heads from US 190 and travels through the town of Merryville. After passing the local high school, the route turns to the southeast and travels  to a junction with LA 27 at Singer. Here, LA 110 turns south onto LA 27 for a short distance before resuming its southeastward course. LA 110 curves slightly along the south of Longville Lake before reaching its eastern terminus at US 171/US 190 in Longville.

Louisiana Highway 111

Louisiana Highway 111 (LA 111) runs  in a general north–south direction from US 190 in Junction, Beauregard Parish to LA 117 northeast of Leesville, Vernon Parish.

Louisiana Highway 112

Louisiana Highway 112 (LA 112) runs  in a general east–west direction from the concurrent US 171/US 190 east of DeRidder, Beauregard Parish to the concurrent US 71/US 167 in Lecompte, Rapides Parish.

Louisiana Highway 113

Louisiana Highway 113 (LA 113) runs  in a southwest to northeast direction from US 190 in Reeves, Allen Parish to the junction of US 165 and LA 497 in Glenmora, Rapides Parish.

The route heads north from US 190 and crosses from Allen Parish into Beauregard Parish after .  At Dry Creek, a junction with LA 394 provides access to the recreational area around Bundick Lake.  LA 113 then intersects LA 26, connecting with DeRidder and Oberlin.  Soon after crossing LA 112 at Sugartown, LA 113 bends to the northeast and enters Vernon Parish.  Reaching the community of Pitkin, LA 113 turns east to follow LA 10 briefly before branching off into Rapides Parish.  At Union Hill, the highway crosses LA 112 once again and proceeds eastward through the southern edge of the Kisatchie National Forest.  Near the end of its route, LA 113 zigzags to the south and east into the town of Glenmora, terminating at US 165 between Oakdale and Alexandria.

Louisiana Highway 114

Louisiana Highway 114 (LA 114) runs  from LA 1 in Echo to LA 1/LA 451 east of Moreauville. LA 114 was portions of SR 30, SR 72 and SR 299 before 1955.

Louisiana Highway 115

Louisiana Highway 115 (LA 115) runs  in a general north–south direction from LA 106 west of St. Landry, Evangeline Parish to LA 28 north of Deville, Rapides Parish.

Louisiana Highway 116

Louisiana Highway 116 (LA 116) runs  from US 165 in Pineville to LA 28 east of Pineville.

Louisiana Highway 117

Louisiana Highway 117 (LA 117) runs  in a north–south direction from a junction with LA 8, LA 28 and LA 1213 in Leesville, Vernon Parish to LA 6 east of Robeline, Natchitoches Parish.

Louisiana Highway 118

Louisiana Highway 118 (LA 118) runs  in an east–west direction from US 171 in Florien, Sabine Parish to a point east of Kisatchie, Natchitoches Parish.

Louisiana Highway 119

Louisiana Highway 119 (LA 119) runs  in a north–south direction from LA 8 at Flatwoods, Rapides Parish to LA 1 in Natchez, Natchitoches Parish.

Louisiana Highway 120

The western section extends from US 171 in Zwolle, Sabine Parish to a point just south of Robeline, Natchitoches Parish. The eastern section extends from LA 117 in Provencal to a junction with LA 1 and LA 494 south of Natchez, Natchitoches Parish.

Louisiana Highway 121

Louisiana Highway 121 (LA 121) runs  in a general southwest to northeast direction from LA 8 at Slagle, Vernon Parish to LA 1 west of Boyce, Rapides Parish.

Louisiana Highway 122

Louisiana Highway 122 (LA 122) runs  from US 71/LA 1239-1 in Montgomery to LA 123 in Dry Prong.

Louisiana Highway 123

Louisiana Highway 123 (LA 123) runs  from LA 8 east of Colfax to US 165 east of Breezy Hill.

Louisiana Highway 124

Louisiana Highway 124 (LA 124) runs  in a general northwest to southeast direction from US 84 east of Winnfield, Winn Parish to LA 3102 at Argo, Catahoula Parish.

Louisiana Highway 125

Louisiana Highway 125 (LA 125) runs  from US 165 in Tullos to US 165 northeast of Olla.

Louisiana Highway 126

Louisiana Highway 126 (LA 126) runs  in a general east–west direction from LA 9 in Reidhimer, Natchitoches Parish to LA 124 north of Jonesville, Catahoula Parish.

Louisiana Highway 127

Louisiana Highway 127 (LA 127) runs  in a north–south direction from a point east of Kitterlin Bay in La Salle Parish to LA 126 east of Sikes, Winn Parish.

Louisiana Highway 128

Louisiana Highway 128 (LA 128) runs  in an east–west direction from LA 4 east of Fort Necessity, Franklin Parish to a junction with LA 605 and LA 897-4 in St. Joseph, Tensas Parish.

The route heads east from LA 4 and intersects the concurrent US 425 and LA 15 in Gilbert.  LA 128 turns north to follow US 425/LA 15 briefly before splitting to the northeast toward Como.  Here, it intersects LA 4 once again and runs concurrent with that highway east across the Tensas River, where it crosses from Franklin Parish into Tensas Parish.  Shortly afterward, LA 128 separates from LA 4 and heads southeast to a point known as Avondale.  LA 128 makes a zigzag via US 65 then proceeds south to its terminus in St. Joseph.

Louisiana Highway 129

Louisiana Highway 129 (LA 129) runs  in a north–south direction from a point on the Red River south of Acme to US 84 west of Ferriday, Concordia Parish.

Louisiana Highway 130

Louisiana Highway 130 (LA 130) runs  from LA 135 north of Liddieville to US 425/LA 4/LA 15/LA 17 in Winnsboro.

Louisiana Highway 131

Louisiana Highway 131 (LA 131) runs  from LA 15 at St. Genevieve to US 84/US 425 in Vidalia.

Louisiana Highway 132

Louisiana Highway 132 (LA 132) runs  in an east–west direction from LA 133 north of Buckner, Richland Parish to LA 17 north of Bakers, Franklin Parish.

Louisiana Highway 133

Louisiana Highway 133 (LA 133) runs  in a north–south direction from LA 4 northeast of Columbia, Caldwell Parish to US 425 south of Oak Ridge, Morehouse Parish. Until 2005, LA 133 continued north to Mer Rouge.

Louisiana Highway 134

Louisiana Highway 134 (LA 134) runs  in an east–west direction from US 165 south of Sterlington, Ouachita Parish to US 65 just outside Lake Providence, East Carroll Parish.

Louisiana Highway 135

Louisiana Highway 135 (LA 135) runs  in a north–south direction from LA 4 in Fort Necessity, Franklin Parish to US 425 south of Rayville, Richland Parish.

Louisiana Highway 136

Louisiana Highway 136 (LA 136) runs  from LA 134 in Fairbanks to US 165/LA 2 in Sterlington.

Louisiana Highway 137

Louisiana Highway 137 (LA 137) was a state highway in Louisiana that serves Richland Parish and Morehouse Parish. It spanned  in a south to north direction.

LA 137 was redesignated as US 425 when it was extended through Louisiana to Mississippi.

Louisiana Highway 138

Louisiana Highway 138 (LA 138) runs  from LA 134 south of Collinston to US 165/US 425/LA 2 in Mer Rouge.

Louisiana Highway 139

Louisiana Highway 139 (LA 139) runs  from US 80 in Monroe to US 165/US 425/LA 2/LA 593 in Bastrop.

Louisiana Highway 140

Louisiana Highway 140 (LA 140) runs  from US 425 in Log Cabin to US 165/LA 599 in Bonita.

Louisiana Highway 141

Louisiana Highway 141 (LA 141) runs  from LA 75 in St. Gabriel to LA 75 in St. Gabriel.

Louisiana Highway 142

Louisiana Highway 142 (LA 142) runs  from US 425 north of Bastrop to AR 133 at Arkansas state line northwest of Beekman.

Louisiana Highway 143

Louisiana Highway 143 (LA 143) runs  in a north–south direction from LA 34 in West Monroe, Ouachita Parish to LA 33 in Marion, Union Parish.

Louisiana Highway 144

Louisiana Highway 144 (LA 144) runs  in a north–south direction from LA 34 in Eros, Jackson Parish to LA 151 at Calhoun, Ouachita Parish.

Louisiana Highway 145

Louisiana Highway 145 (LA 145) runs  in a north–south direction from LA 146 southeast of Ruston in Jackson Parish to LA 15 northeast of Downsville, Union Parish.

Louisiana Highway 146

Louisiana Highway 146 (LA 146) runs  in a northwest to southeast direction from the concurrent US 79 and LA 9 in Homer, Claiborne Parish to LA 4 in Chatham, Jackson Parish.

Louisiana Highway 147

Louisiana Highway 147 (LA 147) runs  in a southeast to northwest direction from LA 34 just north of the Jackson Parish–Winn Parish line to LA 9 in Arcadia, Bienville Parish.

Louisiana Highway 148

The western section extends from a junction with US 167 and LA 818 at Clay to LA 146 at Vernon, Jackson Parish. The eastern section extends from a point southwest of Eros, Jackson Parish, to the Ouachita Parish line.

Louisiana Highway 149

Louisiana Highway 149 (LA 149) runs  in a north–south direction along R.W.E. Jones Drive in Grambling, Lincoln Parish.  It serves as the principal north–south thoroughfare through the town and connects Grambling State University to both I-20 and the parallel US 80.

The route begins at US 80 near the southern limit of Grambling, an area known as Grambling Corners.  LA 149 heads north as an undivided two-lane highway through a rural residential area.  After a short distance, the highway widens to four lanes as it begins to pass through the middle of the Grambling State University campus.  At College Avenue, LA 149 exits the campus and becomes a two-lane highway once again.  It then crosses the Kansas City Southern Railway (KCS) tracks via an overpass and intersects LA 150 (West Martin Luther King Jr. Avenue).  LA 149 then curves to the northeast and passes through an interchange with I-20 at Exit 81, leading toward Monroe and Shreveport.  State maintenance ends immediately afterward at an intersection with Parish Road 333 (North Pinetree Road), and R.W.E. Jones Drive proceeds northward as a local road.

In the pre-1955 state highway system, LA 149 was part of State Route C-1792.  LA 149 was created in the 1955 Louisiana Highway renumbering, largely following a parallel alignment along Main Street.  It was also extended north from its original terminus at LA 150 during the early 1960s when I-20 was constructed through the area.

See also

References

External links
Maps / GIS Data Homepage, Louisiana Department of Transportation and Development